Patrick "Pat" Comben AM (born 3 May 1950) is a former Australian politician.

He was born in Weymouth in Dorset and was raised on the Isle of Portland, Dorset, attending the Portland Secondary Modern School. Leaving school at 16 he migrated by himself to Australia where worked initially as a farm hand, labourer and stockman. Attending night school as a mature aged student, he matriculated and attended the University of Queensland studying law and government, eventually graduating with a Bachelor of Arts.

In 1983 Comben was elected to the Queensland Legislative Assembly as the Labor member for Windsor. In 1986 he was appointed Opposition Spokesperson on the Environment, Administrative Services and Corrective Services; in 1987 he was moved to Health and Environment, with Conservation added in 1988. When the Goss Labor government came to power in 1989 he was appointed Minister for Environment and Heritage, and in 1992 he was promoted to Minister for Education.

The electorate of Windsor was abolished in the 1992 redistribution and Comben transferred to Kedron in 1992, retiring from parliament in 1995. On 26 January 2008 he was made a Member of the Order of Australia.

In 1999 he was ordained by Archbishop Peter Hollingworth as an honorary deacon of the Anglican Church, and sat on Clarence Valley Council from 2008 to 2012.

When Comben was registrar of the Grafton, New South Wales, diocese in the 2000s, he was central to handling a group claim from people who had suffered abuse in a NSW Anglican children's home in Lismore, New South Wales. It was alleged at a November 2013 session of the Royal Commission into Institutional Responses to Child Sexual Abuse that Comben had been more concerned about the finances of the diocese than the welfare of the many people who had been abused. Appearing at a subsequent session of the commission, Comben said he had recently signed papers relinquishing holy orders because "some members of the church were trying to rewrite history". He told the commission that he took the stance he did because he thought the lawyer for the claimants was bullying, and because others in the diocese told him there had never been any problems at the home. He now realised that the approach he took was wrong.

In July 2015, the Professional Standards Board of the Anglican church stripped Mr Comben of his holy orders. In a statement, it says “Under church law, there is no avenue of appeal.’’

References

1950 births
Living people
Members of the Queensland Legislative Assembly
Australian Labor Party members of the Parliament of Queensland